Ugo Maria Brachetti Peretti (born July 8, 1965, Rome) is an Italian oil executive, chairman of the API group since 2007.

Family

His father, Count Aldo Maria Brachetti Peretti, Cavaliere Del Lavoro was the head of the family group, Anonima Petroli Italiana (API) for thirty years, until his retirement in September 2007. The company was founded by his maternal grandfather Cavaliere Del Lavoro Ferdinando Peretti. His mother, Mila Peretti, is the National Inspectress of the Italian Red Cross, which she has served for over 30 years. She is the only woman in Italy to carry the military grade of General. In 2005 Peretti married the Countess Isabella Borromeo Arese Taverna. They have three children: Angera (b. 2005), Ludovico (b. 2008) and Federico (b. 2012).

Career
He was educated at the American Community School in London where he graduated in 1983 with an international Baccalaureate degree and then qualified for a degree in Business Administration at the American University of Rome in 1987. He subsequently obtained his specialization at Boston University. He completed his military service as an officer of the Carabinieri. 
 
After 1990, he started working as a manager in the family business of which he and his brothers are 100% shareholders. During his time with API he has held many positions, at first operating the "downstream cycle" (a combination of activities such as deliveries, transportation, refining, sale and marketing of oil). In 2007, after a series of promotions, he became Chairman of the company. In this capacity, he focused the Group's activities back to the oil sector, with the strengthening of the distribution network and the improvement of the Falconara refinery. He holds several other chairs, vice-chairs and advisory positions within API as well as being a member of the boards at UniCredit, the Executive Council of the "Rome Industrial Union" and Unione Petrolifera.

In 2019, he was appointend Cavaliere Del Lavoro by the president Sergio Mattarella for the oil and energy sector.

References

External links
API corporate website

1965 births
Living people
Businesspeople from Rome
People educated at ACS International Schools
Carabinieri